The Wilga is a 67 kilometre long river in eastern Poland south of Warsaw and lies in Garwolin County. It is a tributary of the Vistula.

Rivers of Poland
Rivers of Masovian Voivodeship